William Hammond (29 August 1947 – 30 January 2021) was a New Zealand artist who was part of the Post-colonial Gothic movement at the end of the 1990s. He lived and worked in Lyttelton, New Zealand. The theme of his works centred around the environment and social justice.

Early life
Hammond was born in Christchurch on 29 August 1947. He attended Burnside High School. He went on to study at the Ilam School of Fine Arts of the University of Canterbury from 1966 until 1969. Before embarking on his career in art, he worked in a sign factory, made wooden toys, and was a jewellery designer. He also had a keen interest in music, serving as the percussionist for a jug band.

Career
Hammond started to exhibit his works in 1980, and went back to painting on a full-time basis one year later. His first solo exhibition came in March 1987, at the Peter McLeavey Gallery in Wellington. This was followed by over 20 further exhibitions at the aforementioned gallery.

One of Hammond's best known work was the painting Waiting for Buller (1993). This was in reference to Walter Lawry Buller, the first New Zealander ornithologist who wrote A History of New Zealand Birds in 1873. Hammond was particularly interested in the contradictions in Buller's life, in how he documented birds while being a hunter and taxidermist. Another noted piece of his was Fall of Icarus (1995), which explores the effects of the colonisation on the country, and is exhibited at Christchurch Art Gallery. The Guardian described this as "his most famous work". His painting Bone Yard, Open Home (2009) was the largest single piece of canvas he painted, with a width of more than four metres.

Themes
The overarching theme of Hammond's work was social and environmental issues. Specifically, it touched on the imperiled state of both, as well as the destruction brought on by colonisation. His paintings feature two common themes: references to popular music and gaunt creatures with avian heads and human limbs. The characters in Hammond's paintings, which were often anthropomorphic animals, rarely move away from their natural habitat and are in no hurry. Humans are notably absent from his works during the later part of his career, which was influenced by his visit to the Auckland Islands in 1989. Two signature colors employed by Hammond were emerald green and gold. He was also at the forefront of the Post-colonial Gothic movement. This ultimately became "one of the most influential tendencies in New Zealand painting" at the turn of the 3rd millennium.

Later life
Hammond eschewed giving interviews and guarded his privacy. He died on the evening of 30 January 2021, at the age of 73. He was labelled as one of the country's "most influential contemporary painters" by Radio New Zealand.

Collections
Chartwell Collection at the Auckland Art Gallery 
Christchurch Art Gallery
Fletcher Trust Collection
Museum of New Zealand 
Sarjeant Gallery
University of Auckland Art Collection
Victoria and Albert Museum, London.

References

External links
NZ Artists online gallery and biography

1947 births
2021 deaths
Contemporary painters
Ilam School of Fine Arts alumni
New Zealand painters
People from Lyttelton, New Zealand
20th-century New Zealand painters
20th-century New Zealand male artists